Hümaşah Sultan may refer to:

 Hüma Hatun (1410-1449), wife of Murad II
 Hümaşah Sultan (daughter of Bayezid II) (1466–?), Ottoman princess and daughter of Bayezid II
 Ayşe Sultan (daughter of Rüstem Pasha) (1541–1598), daughter of Mihrimah Sultan and granddaughter of Süleyman the Magnificent and Hürrem Sultan
 Hümaşah Sultan (daughter of Şehzade Mehmed) (1544-1582), Ottoman princess, daughter of Şehzade Mehmed and granddaughter of Süleyman the Magnificent and Hürrem Sultan. 
 Hümaşah Sultan (daughter of Murad III) ( 1564 – ?), Ottoman princess, daughter of Murad III and Safiye Sultan
 Hümaşah Sultan (17th century), Ottoman princess, daughter of Sultan Mehmed III
 Hümaşah Sultan (wife of Ibrahim) (1630s–1680s), wife of Sultan Ibrahim of the Ottoman Empire

See also 
 Huma (disambiguation)